Echidnas, sometimes known as spiny anteaters, are quill-covered monotremes (egg-laying mammals) belonging to the family Tachyglossidae . The four extant species of echidnas and the platypus are the only living mammals that lay eggs and the only surviving members of the order Monotremata. The diet of some species consists of ants and termites, but they are not closely related to the true anteaters of the Americas, which (along with sloths and armadillos) are xenarthrans. Echidnas live in Australia and New Guinea.

Echidnas evolved between 20 and 50 million years ago, descending from a platypus-like monotreme. This ancestor was aquatic, but echidnas adapted to life on land.

Etymology
Echidnas are named after Echidna, a creature from Greek mythology who was half-woman, half-snake, as the animal was perceived to have qualities of both mammals and reptiles.

Physical characteristics
Echidnas are medium-sized, solitary mammals covered with coarse hair and spines. The spines are modified hairs and are made of keratin, the same fibrous protein that makes up fur, claws, nails, and horn sheaths in animals.

Superficially, they resemble the anteaters of South America and other spiny mammals such as hedgehogs and porcupines. They are usually black or brown in coloration. There have been several reports of albino echidnas, their eyes pink and their spines white. They have elongated and slender snouts that function as both mouth and nose. Like the platypus, they are equipped with electrosensors, but while the platypus has 40,000 electroreceptors on its bill, the long-beaked echidna has only 2,000. The short-beaked echidna, which lives in a drier environment, has no more than 400 at the tip of its snout. Echidnas use their electroreceptive beaks to sense earthworms, termites, ants, and other burrowing prey.

Echidnas have short, strong limbs with large claws, and are powerful diggers. Their claws on their hind limbs are elongated and curved backwards to aid in digging. Echidnas have tiny mouths and toothless jaws. The echidna feeds by tearing open soft logs, anthills and the like, and using its long, sticky tongue, which protrudes from its snout, to collect prey. The ears are slits on the sides of their heads that are usually unseen, as they are blanketed by their spines. The external ear is created by a large cartilaginous funnel, deep in the muscle. At 33 °C (91.4 °F), the echidna also possesses the second-lowest active body temperature of all mammals, behind the platypus.

Despite their appearance, echidnas are capable swimmers, as they evolved from platypus-like ancestors. When swimming, they expose their snout and some of their spines, and are known to journey to water in order to groom and bathe themselves.

The first European drawing of an echidna was made in Adventure Bay, Tasmania by 's third lieutenant George Tobin during William Bligh's second breadfruit voyage.

Diet
The short-beaked echidna's diet consists mostly of ants and termites, while the Zaglossus (long-beaked) species typically eat worms and insect larvae. The tongues of long-beaked echidnas have sharp, tiny spines that help them capture their prey. They have no teeth, so they break down their food by grinding it between the bottoms of their mouths and their tongues.

Habitat
Echidnas do not tolerate extreme temperatures; they use caves and rock crevices to shelter from harsh weather conditions. Echidnas are found in forests and woodlands, hiding under vegetation, roots or piles of debris. They sometimes use the burrows (both abandoned and in use) of animals such as rabbits and wombats. Individual echidnas have large, mutually overlapping territories.

Anatomy
Echidnas and the platypus are the only egg-laying mammals, known as monotremes. 
The average lifespan of an echidna in the wild is estimated to be around 14–16 years. An echidna's sex can be inferred from its size, as males are 25% larger than females on average. The reproductive organs also differ, but both sexes have a single opening called a cloaca, which they use to urinate, release their faeces, and to mate.

Male echidnas have non-venomous spurs on the hind feet.

The neocortex makes up half of the echidna's brain, compared to 80% of a human brain. Due to their low metabolism and accompanying stress resistance, echidnas are long-lived for their size; the longest recorded lifespan for a captive echidna is 50 years, with anecdotal accounts of wild individuals reaching 45 years. Contrary to previous research, the echidna does enter REM sleep, but only when the ambient temperature is around 25 °C (77 °F). At temperatures of 15 °C (59 °F) and 28 °C (82 °F), REM sleep is suppressed.

Reproduction
The female lays a single soft-shelled, leathery egg 22 days after mating, and deposits it directly into her pouch. While hatching, the baby echidna opens the leather shell with a reptile-like egg tooth. Hatching takes place after 10 days of gestation; the young echidna, called a puggle, born larval and fetus-like, then sucks milk from the pores of the two milk patches (monotremes have no nipples) and remains in the pouch for 45 to 55 days, at which time it starts to develop spines. The mother digs a nursery burrow and deposits the young, returning every five days to suckle it until it is weaned at seven months. Puggles will stay within their mother's den for up to a year before leaving.Male echidnas have a four-headed penis. During mating, the heads on one side "shut down" and do not grow in size; the other two are used to release semen into the female's two-branched reproductive tract. Each time it copulates, it alternates heads in sets of two. When not in use, the penis is retracted inside a preputial sac in the cloaca. These may be used to induce ovulation in the female.

It is a challenge to study the echidna in its natural habitat and they show no interest in mating while in captivity. Prior to 2007, no one had ever seen an echidna ejaculate. There have been previous attempts, trying to force the echidna to ejaculate through the use of electrically stimulated ejaculation in order to obtain semen samples but this has only resulted in the penis swelling.

Breeding season begins in late June and extends through September. Males will form lines up to ten individuals long, the youngest echidna trailing last, that follow the female and attempt to mate. During a mating season an echidna may switch between lines. This is known as the "train" system.

Threats
Echidnas are very timid animals. When they feel endangered they attempt to bury themselves or if exposed they will curl into a ball similar to that of a hedgehog, both methods using their spines to shield them. Strong front arms allow echidnas to continue to dig themselves in whilst holding fast against a predator attempting to remove them from the hole.

Although they have a way to protect themselves, the echidnas still face many dangers. Some predators include feral cats, foxes, domestic dogs, and goannas. Snakes pose a large threat to the echidna species because they slither into their burrows and prey on the young spineless puggles.

Some precautions that can be taken include keeping the environment clean by picking up litter and causing less pollution, planting vegetation for echidnas to use as shelter, supervising pets, reporting hurt echidnas, and leaving them undisturbed. Merely grabbing them may cause stress, while picking them up improperly may result in injury.

Evolution

The first divergence between oviparous (egg-laying) and viviparous (offspring develop internally) mammals is believed to have occurred during the Triassic period. However, there is still some disagreement on this estimated time of divergence. Though most findings from genetics studies (especially those concerning nuclear genes) are in agreement with the paleontological findings, some results from other techniques and sources, like mitochondrial DNA, are in slight disagreement with findings from fossils.

Molecular clock data suggest echidnas split from platypuses between 19 and 48 million years ago, and that platypus-like fossils dating back to over 112.5 million years ago, therefore, represent basal forms, rather than close relatives of the modern platypus. This would imply that echidnas evolved from water-foraging ancestors that returned to living completely on the land, even though this put them in competition with marsupials. Although extant monotremes lack adult teeth (platypus have teeth only as a juvenile), many extinct monotreme species have been identified based on the morphology of their teeth. Of the eight genes involved in tooth development, four have been lost in both platypus and echidna, indicating that the loss of teeth occurred before the echidna-platypus split. 

Further evidence of possible water-foraging ancestors can be found in some of the echidna's phenotypic traits as well. These traits include hydrodynamic streamlining, dorsally projecting hind limbs acting as rudders, and locomotion founded on hypertrophied humeral long-axis rotation, which provides a very efficient swimming stroke. Consequently, oviparous reproduction in monotremes may have given them an advantage over marsupials, a view consistent with present ecological partitioning between the two groups. This advantage could as well be in part responsible for the observed associated adaptive radiation of echidnas and expansion of the niche space, which together contradict the fairly common assumption of halted morphological and molecular evolution that continues to be associated with monotremes.

It has been suggested that echidnas evolved in isolation in New Guinea when it was isolated from Australia. This would explain both their rarity in the fossil record, their local abundance in present times there and their acquisition of terrestrial niches, presumably without competition from marsupials.

Taxonomy
Echidnas are classified into three genera. The genus Zaglossus includes three extant species and two species known only from fossils, while only one extant species from the genus Tachyglossus is known. The third genus, Megalibgwilia, is known only from fossils.

Zaglossus

The three living Zaglossus species are endemic to New Guinea. They are rare and are hunted for food. They forage in leaf litter on the forest floor, eating earthworms and insects. The species are
Western long-beaked echidna (Z. bruijni), of the highland forests;
Sir David's long-beaked echidna (Z. attenboroughi), discovered by Western science in 1961 (described in 1998) and preferring a still higher habitat;
Eastern long-beaked echidna (Z. bartoni), of which four distinct subspecies have been identified.

The one fossil species is:
†Zaglossus robustus.

Tachyglossus

The short-beaked echidna (Tachyglossus aculeatus) is found in southern, southeast and northeast New Guinea, and also occurs in almost all Australian environments, from the snow-clad Australian Alps to the deep deserts of the Outback, essentially anywhere ants and termites are available. It is smaller than the Zaglossus species, and it has longer hair.

Despite the similar dietary habits and methods of consumption to those of an anteater, there is no evidence supporting the idea that echidna-like monotremes have been myrmecophagic (ant or termite-eating) since the Cretaceous. The fossil evidence of invertebrate-feeding bandicoots and rat-kangaroos, from around the time of the platypus–echidna divergence and pre-dating Tachyglossus, show evidence that echidnas expanded into new ecospace despite competition from marsupials.

Megalibgwilia
The genus Megalibgwilia is known only from fossils:

M. ramsayi from Late Pleistocene sites in Australia;
M. robusta from Miocene sites in Australia.

Murrayglossus
The genus Murrayglossus is known only from fossils:
 M. hacketti (previously classified in the genus Zaglossus) from Pleistocene of Western Australia.

As food 
The Kunwinjku people of Western Arnhem Land call the echidna ngarrbek, and regard it as a prized food and "good medicine" (Reverend Peterson Nganjmirra, personal comment). The echidna is hunted at night and, after being gutted, it is filled with hot stones and mandak (Persoonia falcata) leaves. According to Larrakia elders, Una Thompson and Stephanie Thompson Nganjmirra, when captured, an echidna is carried attached to the wrist like a thick bangle.

In popular culture
 The echidna appears on the reverse of the Australian five-cent coin.
 Knuckles the Echidna is a popular character from the Sonic the Hedgehog video game franchise, debuting in Sonic the Hedgehog 3.
 An echidna named Millie was one of the three official mascots for the 2000 Summer Olympics in Sydney.

References

Bibliography

External links

Electroreceptive animals
Mammals of the Northern Territory
Articles containing video clips
Rolling animals
Extant Miocene first appearances
Taxa named by Theodore Gill
Endemic fauna of Oceania
Monotremes